The Gecarcinidae, the land crabs, are a family of true crabs that are adapted for terrestrial existence. Similar to all other crabs, land crabs possess a series of gills. In addition, the part of the carapace covering the gills is inflated and equipped with blood vessels. These organs extract oxygen from the air, analogous to the vertebrate lungs. Adult land crabs are terrestrial, but visit the sea periodically, where they breed and their larvae develop. Land crabs are tropical omnivores which sometimes cause considerable damage to crops. Most land crabs have one of their claws larger than the other.

The family contains these genera:
 Cardisoma
 Discoplax
 Epigrapsus
 Gecarcinus
 Gecarcoidea
 Johngarthia
 Tuerkayana

See also
Sesarmidae, another family of terrestrial crabs
Coenobitidae, terrestrial hermit crabs

References

Encarta Reference Library Premium 2005 DVD.

External links 

 
 

Grapsoidea
Decapod families